The 1913 All England Open Badminton Championships was a badminton tournament held at the Royal Horticultural Hall, Westminster, England from 27 February to 2 March 1913.

Former champion Guy Sautter competed in the 1913 tournament under the alias of U. N. Lappin and went on to win his second men's singles title. Lavinia Radeglia won the women's singles defeating defending champion Margaret Tragett in the final. Alice Gowenlock was unable to defend her doubles title after pulling out with an ankle injury.

Final results

Men's singles
In the first round Prior beat Plews 15-8, 18-15 and Chesterton beat Middlemass 15-6 15-0.

Women's singles

Men's doubles

+ alias

Women's doubles

Mixed doubles

+ alias

References

All England Open Badminton Championships
All England
All England Championships
All England Open Badminton Championships in London
All England Badminton Championships
All England Badminton Championships
All England Badminton Championships